A Ground Equipment Facility of the Federal Aviation Administration (FAA) is a radar station or other designated Air Traffic Control site of the United States.  Several of the facilities originated as Cold War SAGE radar stations, including some facilities of the joint-use site system (JUSS) (e.g., San Pedro Hill Air Force Station provided radar tracks for both the Army and USAF).  The USAF declared full operational capability of the 1st 7 Regional Operational Control Centers (ROCCs) on December 23, 1980.

References

Federal Aviation Administration
Joint Surveillance System radar stations
Lists of Cold War sites